Tommaso Benedetti (1797–1863) was an English-born Austrian painter of Italian descent. He was born in London, went early to Vienna, where he lived for the remainder of his life.

Among his engravings are: 
Two Portraits of the ‘’Emperor Francis I after Ammerling and after Kupelwieser.Portrait of Duke of Reichstadt; after Daffinger,Portrait of the Archduke Charles of Austria; after Kriehuber.The Entombment and Madonna with Cherries'' after Titian.

Sources

1797 births
1863 deaths
Artists from London
English people of Italian descent
18th-century Italian painters
Italian male painters
19th-century Italian painters
19th-century Austrian painters
19th-century Italian male artists
Austrian male painters
British emigrants to Austria
18th-century Italian male artists